Ethylmalonyl-CoA decarboxylase is an enzyme with systematic name (S)-ethylmalonyl-CoA carboxy-lyase (butanoyl-CoA-forming). This enzyme catalyses the following chemical reaction

 (S)-ethylmalonyl-CoA  butanoyl-CoA + CO2

The vertebrate enzyme decarboxylates ethylmalonyl-CoA.

References

External links 
 

EC 4.1.1